The  is Odakyu Electric Railway's name for its limited express luxury tourist services south-west of Tokyo, to mountain resorts such as Hakone and Gotemba (Mount Fuji), and beaches such as Odawara and Enoshima. When the service started in 1957 with the 3000 series SE trainset, it broke the world speed record for a narrow gauge train. This record gave impetus for the design of the first Shinkansen, the 0 series. The 50th anniversary of the Romancecar's narrow gauge world speed record was celebrated September 28, 2007. Some of the latest designs incorporate regenerative braking.

Name origin
The name comes from romance seats, two-person seats without separating armrests when one-person seats were a norm. Some Romancecars are equipped with standard seats featuring armrests. Other railroad companies also used "romance cars" or "romance seats" (a Japanese portmanteau for "loveseat") for their special accommodation passenger cars, but Odakyu holds the trademark for the term "Romancecar".

Service

Odakyu currently operates the following Romancecar services:

Hakone and Super Hakone service between Shinjuku and Hakone-Yumoto (on Hakone Tozan Line, terminal station for visiting Hakone mountains and springs)
Metro Hakone service between Hakone-Yumoto and Kita-senju (in north-east of Tokyo) (direct through service to the Tokyo Metro Chiyoda Line from Yoyogi-Uehara)
Enoshima service between Shinjuku and Katase-Enoshima (in Fujisawa, Kanagawa)
Metro Enoshima service between Katase-Enoshima and Kita-senju (direct through service to the Tokyo Metro Chiyoda Line from Yoyogi-Uehara)
Mt. Fuji service between Shinjuku and Gotemba on JR Central Gotemba Line 
Sagami service between Shinjuku and Odawara (in Odawara, Kanagawa) 
Morning Way trains inbound from Odawara, Katase-Enoshima to Shinjuku until 9:30 a.m.
Metro Morning Way trains inbound from Hon-Atsugi to Kita-senju (on Tokyo Metro Chiyoda Line)
Home Way trains outbound from Shinjuku to Hakone-Yumoto, Katase-Enoshima after 6 p.m.
Metro Home Way trains outbound from Kita-senju (on Tokyo Metro Chiyoda Line) to Hon-Atsugi

These are classified as tokkyū (limited express) services, requiring limited express tickets and seat reservations. Bento meals are available on the train.

Trainset evolution
Odakyu 3000 series SE: These pioneering rapid rail trains were introduced in 1957 and were commonly used until 1968; one was used until 1991. They set the world speed record for narrow gauge track in September 1957 at 145 km/h and were an inspiration for the world's first high speed train, the Shinkansen. They later earned Japan's Blue Ribbon design award. The 8-car trains could seat 354 people.
Odakyu 3100 series NSE: A taller, upgraded version of the 3000 series, it was used from 1963 until 1999. The 3100 series was the longest Romancecar in common service and gave it its distinctive look. The Nagoya Railroad Panorama Car design was based on the 3100 series. The 11-car trainset could seat 464 people, and had a maximum design speed of 170 km/h.
Odakyu 7000 series LSE: Entering service in 1980, it has a 180-degree front view of scenery. It has seating for 464 people in 11 cars—identical to the 3100 series. It was manufactured by Kawasaki Heavy Industries. The two remaining sets were withdrawn from regular service on July 10, 2018, and are scheduled to be operating seasonally until the end of the fiscal year.
Odakyu 10000 series HiSE: Introduced in 1988, like its predecessor, the 7000 series LSE, these two types are very closely related, and were once the top grade of Romancecar service, but with larger seats than the 7000. Like the LSE and VSE, the driver's compartment is elevated so that passengers at the front of the train have an unimpeded 180 degree view of the scenery. These trains are used for Hakone services, plying the same route as the VSE but stopping more often; the trip to Hakone takes about 90 minutes. Cabin attendants are available for food and drink service, except in the evening. The two remaining sets were withdrawn on March 16, 2012.
They were the only Odakyu trains with first-class seating in "semi-compartments" on the upper deck of two bi-level cars in the center of each train. It was the first in the series to break from the traditional wine red color, being baby blue.
Odakyu 30000 series EXE: Introduced in 1996, these currently operate most Romancecar services. Most are equipped with vending machines on board, and some also have cabin attendants. They are boxy and metallic bronze in color. From fiscal 2016, sets have undergone a programme of refurbishment; refurbished sets are branded EXEα (Excellent Express Alpha). 
Odakyu 50000 series VSE: Introduced in 2005, the white VSE features the driver's compartment elevated over the cabin as with the HiSE. VSE trains are primarily used for Super Hakone services and have cabin attendants who bring food, drinks, and on-board shopping to each passenger's seat during the 80-minute run to Hakone. There are seats for 358 people. The two sets were withdrawn from regular service on March 11, 2022, and are due to be completely withdrawn in fall 2023.
Odakyu 60000 series MSE: The first Romancecar to be used on through services on the Tokyo Metro Chiyoda Line. Entered service in March 2008.
Odakyu 70000 series GSE: The newest "Romancecar" model, with an elevated driver's compartment similar to the HiSE and VSE. Entered service in March 2018.

In popular culture
 Open Me!, the series finale of Ultra Q, features a flying Odakyu 3100 Series called The Train In The Vary Dimension. It journeys to a pocket dimension with its passengers, a place where those within can be free of the hardships and struggles of daily life, but upon returning, those aboard are left forever insane and unable to go back.
 Romansu (Round Trip Heart), a 2015 Japanese film about a train attendant who works on Romancecar services between Shinjuku and Hakone

References

Further reading

External links
Limited Express "Romancecar" (Odakyu Electric Railway)

Named passenger trains of Japan
Odakyu Electric Railway
Railway services introduced in 1957
1957 establishments in Japan